Psilocybe fuscofulva is a species of mushroom in that grows on Sphagnum moss and rarely decaying wood in peat bogs in North America and Europe. It is the only species of Psilocybe currently known to not produce psilocybin or psilocin. The phylogenetic placement indicates its close relationship to Psilocybe silvatica and Psilocybe semilanceata. It was previously most commonly known as Psilocybe atrobrunnea but the holotype does not exist and the neotype of this species was lost, so Psilocybe fuscofulva, which was previously regarded as a synonym but has a holotype, was resurrected to replace it.

It is considered inedible.

See also
List of Psilocybe species

References

External links

fuscovulva
Fungi described in 1887
Fungi of North America
Fungi of Europe
Inedible fungi
Taxa named by Charles Horton Peck